Nizhnekardailsky is a rural locality (a khutor) in Kulikovskoye Rural Settlement, Novonikolayevsky District, Volgograd Oblast, Russia. The population was 91 as of 2010. There are 5 streets.

Geography 
Nizhnekardailsky is located in forest steppe, on the Khopyorsko-Buzulukskaya Plain, on the right bank of the Kardail River, 36 km southeast of Novonikolayevsky (the district's administrative centre) by road. Kikvidze is the nearest rural locality.

References 

Rural localities in Novonikolayevsky District